Maulana Zia ur Rehman Farooqi (1953 – 18 January 1997) was the co-founder and former head of Sipah-e-Sahaba Pakistan.

References

1953 births
1997 deaths
Pakistani religious leaders
People from Faisalabad
University of the Punjab alumni
Sipah-e-Sahaba Pakistan people
Chiefs of Sipah-e-Sahaba Pakistan
Pakistani politicians
People from Samundri
Jamia Khairul Madaris alumni